Wayne Odesnik was the defending champion but lost in the final to Federico Delbonis 6–7(4–7), 3–6.

Seeds

Draw

Finals

Top half

Bottom half

References
 Main Draw
 Qualifying Draw

Seguros Bolivar Open Bucaramanga - Singles
2013 Singles